Andrew John Dawber (born 20 November 1994) is an English former professional footballer who played as a goalkeeper.

Career
Born in Wigan, Dawber made his senior debut for Accrington Stanley on 4 September 2012 in the 0–2 defeat to Morecambe in the first round of the Football League Trophy. His performance "impressed" manager Paul Cook. In February 2013, Dawber signed a new contract with the club which ran until the summer of 2015. In August 2013, Dawber joined Northern Premier League side Marine on one-month loan, before joining Clitheroe, also on a one-month loan, in October 2013. He re-joined Clitheroe on two-month loan deal in September 2014. He left Accrington Stanley by mutual consent in March 2015.

Dawber joined Championship team Fulham on a one-year contract in July 2015. He signed a one-month loan deal with Aldershot Town in September 2015, and with Bishop's Stortford in February 2016. After leaving Fulham he signed for Altrincham in May 2016.

He signed for Crewe Alexandra in March 2017, until the end of the season. On 9 May 2017, Crewe announced that Dawber had been released by the club.

He later played for Charnock Richard, making his debut in a 3–1 win over Hanley Town in September 2017.

Career statistics

References

1994 births
Living people
Footballers from Wigan
English footballers
Accrington Stanley F.C. players
Marine F.C. players
Clitheroe F.C. players
Fulham F.C. players
Aldershot Town F.C. players
Bishop's Stortford F.C. players
Altrincham F.C. players
Crewe Alexandra F.C. players
Charnock Richard F.C. players
English Football League players
Association football goalkeepers